Texas is an unincorporated community in Heard County, in the U.S. state of Georgia.

History
A post office called Texas was established in 1873, and remained in operation until 1940. The community was named after the state of Texas.

References

Unincorporated communities in Heard County, Georgia
Unincorporated communities in Georgia (U.S. state)